Miss Ukraine (Міс України or Панна України, Panna Ukrayiny) is a national Beauty pageant in Ukraine.

Today it is one of the top three national beauty contests in Ukraine, others being Miss Ukraine Universe and Queen of Ukraine. Miss Ukraine serves as preliminary for the Miss World, Miss International and Miss Earth. Until 2006 it was the only national beauty contest, participants of which were qualifying for all the international pageant contests. Miss Ukraine still is the most prestigious and broadcast, however other concourses such as Miss Ukraine Universe with the help from Oleksandra Nikolayenko becomes well accepted also.

Historical overview

The first national pageant Miss Ukraine became an 18-year-old university student Olha Ovcharenko/Rechdouni, who was also a semi-finalist in "Miss USSR" beauty pageant, and the first runner-up in 1990 Miss Kyiv beauty pageant. The participants of Miss Ukraine would qualify to represent Ukraine on the international level such as the Big Four Pageants, Miss Intercontinental, and continental beauty contests. Miss Universe contest usually was attended by the first runner-up of Miss Ukraine but sometimes the winner can also compete. The national beauty contest was reorganized after Miss Ukraine Organization lost its franchise to one of the former pageant winners Oleksandra Nikolayenko (2001). Since 2006, Oleksandra Nikolayenko organizes Miss Ukraine Universe concourse as qualification to Miss Universe independently.

The contest takes place out of 26 candidates from all the regions of Ukraine. The major regional contests are Miss Kyiv, Miss Odesa, Miss Donbass, Miss Western Ukraine and Bukovina, Miss Dnipropetrovsk, and others.

In 2002 Miss World 2002 was attended by the first runner-up of Miss Ukraine Iryna Udovenko as the winner of the national contest Yelena Stohniy was over the age restriction to participate on the international level.

Since 2005, Miss Ukraine has been broadcast every year by one of the leaders of the national TV-networks Inter.

In 2010, the Ukrainian National pageant took place on September 4. The winner received a crown estimated at 250,000 euros, a Renault car, and various make-up products.

Guests and jury

Venues
2013: Fairmont Grand Hotel
2012: National Opera of Ukraine
2010-2011: Palace Ukraina

Titleholders

Miss Ukraine World

Color key

The winner of Miss Ukraine represents her country at the Miss World. On occasion, when the winner does not qualify (due to age) for either contest, a runner-up is sent. Traditionally there are titles for Winner, Runners-up and People's Choice Award.

Miss Ukraine International
Color key

The second title of Miss Ukraine represents her country at the Miss International. On occasion, when the winner does not qualify (due to age) for either contest, a runner-up is sent. The other delegates might compete after Miss Ukraine Organization cast their official recruitment.

Miss Earth Ukraine
Color key

In 2013 to 2015 the winner of Queen of Ukraine represented her country at the Miss Earth. Began in 2016 the third title of Miss Ukraine represents her country at the Miss Earth. On occasion, when the winner does not qualify (due to age) for either contest, a runner-up is sent.

Other contests
 Golden Crown of Ukraine (Золота Корона України) was conducted for the first time on November 6, 2004 at the Lviv Theatre of Opera and Ballet. The winner of the contest Yelena Klepko from Poltava won the automobile Peugeot-206, a golden crown, and the title Miss Transport of Ukraine 2004. She also was allowed to participate at the Top Model of the World contest.
 In March 2010 there took place a Miss Bukovel contest as part of popularization of the Prykarpattya ski-resort Bukovel. The contest was won by a representative from Luhansk who later participated in Miss Ukraine 2010 as Miss Bukovel.
 Throughout Ukraine take place numerous other regular regional pageant contests among such are Transcarpathian Open ( 2010), Miss Kyiv City (2009), Miss Crimean Champaign (2010), Miss Sevastopol (2009, 2010), pageant contest of Chernihiv Region (1996), and others.
 In Chicago every year from about a thousand Ukrainian Americans one Miss Ukrainian Diaspora is chosen.

See also
 Miss Ukraine Universe
 Miss Europe
 Ukraine at major beauty pageants
 Miss Ukraine 2017

References

Further reading

External links
 Info on Miss Ukraine and participants of 2009 event
 Main site 
 Miss Ukraine 2007 at natali.ua 
 Official website of InterModels model agency, the agency conducts the Golden Crown of Ukraine contest
 List of miscellaneous pageant contests in Ukraine.
 List of previous winners
 Another list

 
Ukraine
Ukraine
Ukraine
Beauty pageants in Ukraine
Ukrainian awards
Awards established in 1990
1990 establishments in Ukraine